Ralph Edgar McLaurin (1885–1943) was a Major League Baseball outfielder who played in eight games for the 1908 St. Louis Cardinals.

External links

1885 births
1943 deaths
Major League Baseball outfielders
The Citadel Bulldogs baseball coaches
Elon Phoenix baseball coaches
St. Louis Cardinals players
Camden Ouachitas players
Sumter Gamecocks players
Augusta Tourists players
Chattanooga Lookouts players
Waco Navigators players
Fort Worth Panthers players
Baseball players from Florida